This is a list of episodes for the animated television series Monsuno. The first two episodes ("Clash" and "Courage") aired as a one-hour special.

Series overview
{| class="wikitable" style="text-align:center"
|-
! colspan="2" rowspan="2"| Season
! rowspan="2"| Episodes
! colspan="2"| Originally aired (U.S. dates)
|-
! Season Premiere
! Season Finale
|-
| style="background:#788DFF; color:#100; text-align:center;"|
| [[List of Monsuno episodes#Season 1: World Master (2012)|1]]
| 26
| February 23, 2012
| November 21, 2012
|-
| style="background:#00FF00; color:#100; text-align:center;"|
| [[List of Monsuno episodes#Season 2: Combat Chaos (2013–14)|2]]
| 26
| April 21, 2013
| May 25, 2014
|-
| style="background:#FF5F5F; color:#100; text-align:center;"|
| [[List of Monsuno episodes#Season 3 (2014)|3]]
| 13
|  colspan="2"| July 1, 2014
|}

Episodes

Season 1: World Master (2012–13)

Season 2: Combat Chaos (2013)

Season 2 of the American-Japanese produced animated series, titled "Monsuno: Combat Chaos", had been announced. It would "debut later in the year" in the United States on Nicktoons, with a worldwide release then planned across Nickelodeon outlets in 2013. The Japanese Animation News Website, Anime! Anime! Biz, later reported that the United States would broadcast the second season in the second half of 2013. However, despite this, Nicktoons and Monsuno's Facebook would eventually announce that the new episodes would begin airing on April 21, 2013.

Meanwhile, in Japan, the second season of Monsuno, still under the Japanese label of Jūsen Batoru Monsūno, would begin broadcasting on April 3, 2013 on TV Tokyo, with a new opening and ending song performed by Rey. Rey previously did the first opening song of the Japanese release.

Season 3 (2014)

In Greece, the first episode of Season 3 was aired on September 5, 2014, making it the first country to air Season 3 on television. In Japan, the season was never aired on TV Tokyo or even dubbed in Japanese.

On July 1, 2014, the 13-episode third season of Monsuno was distributed digitally in the US as a Hulu exclusive, retaining the "Combat Chaos" title of Season 2.

References

Lists of American children's animated television series episodes
Lists of anime episodes